General elections were held in Buenos Aires Province on 27 October 2019, alongside national elections. The governor and vice governor, as well as half of the Chamber of Deputies and a third of the Senate were renewed. In addition, a number of municipal offices were elected as well.

The candidatures were defined in the open, simultaneous, and mandatory primaries (PASO), which took place on 11 August 2019. Lists that won at least 1.5% of the votes (including blanks) qualified to the general election.

The election resulted in the defeat of incumbent governor María Eugenia Vidal (PRO) to former finance minister and then-congressman Axel Kicillof, of the Frente de Todos (FDT). This accompanied the national trend, in which incumbent president Mauricio Macri, of PRO, lost to the FDT's Alberto Fernández. Vidal is the first governor in the province's history to seek re-election and lose, while Kicillof became the eighth governor (sixth peronist) since the return of democracy in 1983. It was the most polarized election since 1999, with the two most voted candidates summing 90.68% of the votes.

Results

Primaries

Governor and Vice Governor

Chamber of Deputies

Senate

References

External links
Results on the official website of the National Electoral Tribunal (in Spanish)

2019 elections in Argentina
Provincial elections in Argentina
October 2019 events in Argentina